Usha Kiran Building is a residential complex in the neighbourhood of Tardeo in Mumbai, India. At 80 meters, it became the first skyscraper in Mumbai and surpassed the LIC Building in Chennai to become the tallest building in the country and held the title until 1970 when the 35-storied World Trade Center Mumbai was built in South Mumbai.

History
The building was completed in 1961.

Location
The tower is located on Carmichael Road in the neighbourhood of Tardeo. The tower is the only high-rise building on the Carmichael Road locality. The building was designed by Dilawar Noorani, an architect from Mumbai, working for Karim Noorani and Co.

The tower
The tower rises to 80 meters and has 25 floors. It was one of the few buildings in the city to have its own swimming pool in the 1960s.

Incidents
A fire broke out in the building on 27 June 2020. It is said that the fire started in a car park, damaging five cars. However, no casualties were reported.

See also

 List of tallest buildings in Mumbai
 List of tallest buildings in India

References

External links

Skyscrapers in Mumbai
Residential skyscrapers in Mumbai
Residential skyscrapers in India
Buildings and structures completed in 1961
1961 establishments in Maharashtra
20th-century architecture in India